Bazar Ahmad Sanjar (also Romanized as Bāzār Aḩmad Sanjar) is a village in Kambel-e Soleyman Rural District, in the Central District of Chabahar County, Sistan and Baluchestan Province, Iran. At the 2006 census, its population was 86, in 20 families.

References 

Populated places in Chabahar County